Sara Lane (born Susan Russell Lane; March 12, 1949 – March 3, 2023) was an American actress.

Early life
Born Susan Russell Lane in New York City on March 12, 1949, Lane is the daughter of actors Russell Lane and Sara Anderson. She has a younger brother and a younger sister.

When Lane was a baby, she appeared in a television commercial for soap and in an educational film. At age 12, she was in a vitamin commercial. She and her family moved to California when Lane was 12 years old, and she attended Santa Monica High School. Money was Lane's motivation for becoming an actress. She said, "I didn't want to act but I needed money for making clothes, making jewelry, and raising quarter horses." As a teenager, Lane made earrings for herself from broken jewelry, and she and her mother made almost all of her clothes.

Career
In 1964, producer William Castle saw Lane's picture in a newspaper in connection with a Miss Los Angeles Teenage beauty contest. After making screen tests, she was signed for a part in the film I Saw What You Did.

In 1966, executive producer Frank Price signed Lane to portray Elizabeth Grainger on The Virginian. Being the owner of two horses, Lane was an experienced horsewoman and did her own riding scenes on the show except when the producer insisted on use of a double.

Personal life and death
Lane died from breast cancer at her home in Napa, California, on March 3, 2023, at the age of 73. She was survived by her husband, Jon Scott, as well as her daughter, son, granddaughter, and sister.

References

External links  

1949 births
2023 deaths
20th-century American actresses
Actresses from New York City
American film actresses
American television actresses 
Deaths from breast cancer 
Deaths from cancer in California
Western (genre) television actors